Jaime Talens (born 29 January 1933) is a Spanish alpine skier. He competed in three events at the 1956 Winter Olympics.

References

1933 births
Living people
Spanish male alpine skiers
Olympic alpine skiers of Spain
Alpine skiers at the 1956 Winter Olympics
Place of birth missing (living people)
20th-century Spanish people